Miguel Ángel Almazán Quiróz (born May 6, 1982 in Mexico City, Mexico), is a former Mexican football defender. His original club Toluca debuted him on April 20, 2002 in a 2-2 tie against Cruz Azul. He so far has made 80 appearances with the team, and has scored on two occasions.

Honors

Toluca
Primera División de México (4): Apertura 2002, Apertura 2005, Apertura 2008, Primera División de México Bicentenario 2010,

Tijuana
Liga MX (1): Apertura 2012'''

External links

1982 births
Living people
Mexican footballers
Liga MX players
Deportivo Toluca F.C. players
Club Tijuana footballers
Association football defenders